Podzamcze  is a village in the administrative district of Gmina Piekoszów, within Kielce County, Świętokrzyskie Voivodeship, in south-central Poland.

The village has a population of 340.

There are interesting ruins of a palace of Tarło noble family, built in 1645–1650, modelled after the Cracow Bishops' Palace in Kielce. It burnt in the 19th century.

References

Podzamcze
Palaces in Poland